Hatice (also Hadice, Hatçe) is a Greek-origin Turkish feminine given name and Turkish variant of Atica or Attica, the beautiful wider region of Athens, Greece. It means Attica or Atica the wider region of Athens, Greece, and early born baby girl.

People
Notable people with that name include:

Ottoman period
 Hatice Sultan (daughter of Selim I), an Ottoman princess, sister of Suleiman the Magnificent
 Hatice Sultan (daughter of Ahmed III), an 18th-century Ottoman princess, daughter of Sultan Ahmed III
 Hatice Sultan (daughter of Mustafa III), an Ottoman princess, daughter of Sultan Mustafa III and sister of Sultan Selim III
 Hatice Sultan (daughter of Murad V), an Ottoman princess, daughter of Sultan Murad V
 Hatice Muazzez Sultan (1629–1687), wife of Ottoman Sultan Ibrahim I

Modern period
 Hatice Açıkalın (1909–2003), Turkish physician
 Hatice Aslan (born 1962), Turkish actress
 Hatice Çilli (born April 6th), Turkish-American Life Coach,Healler,Realtor
 Hatice Duman (born 1974), Turkish journalist
 Hatice Duman (table tennis) (born 1994), Turkish para table tennis player
 Hatice Guleryuz (born 1968), Turkish artist
 Hatice Sabiha Görkey (1888–1963), Turkish school teacher, politician and one of the first female Turkish parliament members
 Hatice Kumbaracı Gürsöz (born 1945), Turkish painter
 Hatice Kübra İlgün (born 1993), Turkish taekwondo practitioner
 Hatice Özgener (1865–1940), Turkish school teacher, politician and one of the first 18 female members of the parliament
 Hatice Bahar Özgüvenç (born 1984), Turkish footballer
 Hatice Özyurt (born 1987), Turkish-Dutch kickboxer
 Hatice Kübra Yangın (born 1989), Turkish taekwondo practitioner

Places
 Hatice Sultan Palace, Istanbul waterside mansion

References

Turkish feminine given names